Sagamore station was a railroad station located on Pleasant Street in Sagamore, Massachusetts on Cape Cod. It was located across the tracks from the Keith Car & Manufacturing Company.

History

The original station was built by the Cape Cod Branch Railroad in the 1887.  It was in active use until it was replaced by a new station in 1909.

The New York, New Haven & Hartford Railroad built a new brick station building in Sagamore in 1909 based on an architectural design that was similar to the Buzzards Bay and West Barnstable stations, both of which stand to this day. All that remains of the former Sagamore station is its foundation.

References

External links

Sandwich, Massachusetts
Old Colony Railroad Stations on Cape Cod
Stations along Old Colony Railroad lines
Former railway stations in Massachusetts